The Netherlands toured Scotland from 21 June to 29 June 2011. The tour originally consisted of three Twenty20 Internationals (T20) and one ICC Intercontinental Cup match, but the Twenty20 Internationals were replaced by a pair of One Day Internationals (ODI).

Intercontinental Cup

ODI series

1st ODI

2nd ODI

References

International cricket competitions in 2011
2011 in Scottish cricket
2011 in Dutch sport